Hirosada II, also known as Sadahiro II, was a designer of ukiyo-e Japanese woodblock prints in Osaka.  He was a student of Konishi Hirosada, and assumed the name “Hirosada” in 1853, when his teacher ceased designing prints.  In the summer of 1864, Hirosada I died and his student changed his name, for a second time, from “Hirosada” (廣貞) to “Sadahiro” (貞廣).

Signature

Whereas the signature of Hirosada I is compact, Hirosada II signed his name in a large bold hand.

References
 Keyes, Roger S., and Susumu Matsudaira, Hirosada, Ōsaka Printmaker, Long Beach, CA, University Art Museum, California State University, Long Beach, 1984, 16–17, 129–130.
 Lane, Richard. (1978).  Images from the Floating World, The Japanese Print. Oxford: Oxford University Press. ;  OCLC 5246796

Japanese printmakers
Ukiyo-e artists
19th-century Japanese people